Nomad is the third album by fusion band Tribal Tech, a project led by guitarist Scott Henderson and bassist Gary Willis. The album was recorded in April 1988, but not released until 1990.

Delay of release
Although Nomad was recorded and mixed in 1988, its release was delayed by nearly two years because Tribal Tech's previous label Passport Records went bankrupt, and the group had to search for another label and buy back the rights of the album. By 1989, Tribal Tech had been signed to Relativity Records, and Nomad was planned for release that summer. However, the album was not officially released until early 1990.

On the album's delay, Henderson told Guitar World: "I actually had to buy back my own record from the bank. But before they allowed me to do that, they ran an investigation on me to find out if I was anybody important–if I was some kind of million-seller rock star or something. And when they finally realized that it was actually a jazz record, that it wasn't going to be worth mega-bucks to them, they agreed to sell it to me, which took a few more months to negotiate. Once I got possession of the album, I had to shop for a new deal, which took another seven months."

Track listing 

"Renegade" (Gary Willis) – 5:51
"Nomad" (Scott Henderson) – 7:18
"Robot Immigrants" (Brad Dutz, David Goldblatt) – 5:09
"Tunnel Vision" (Gary Willis) – 4:43
"Elegy For Shoe" (David Goldblatt) – 4:09
"Bofat" (Scott Henderson) – 8:34
"No No No" (Gary Willis) – 5:53
"Self Defense" (Gary Willis) – 5:00
"Rituals" (Scott Henderson) – 5:44

Personnel
 Scott Henderson - Guitars
 Gary Willis - Bass
 Brad Dutz - Mallets & Percussion
 David Goldblatt - Keyboards
 Steve Houghton - Drums

References

1990 albums
Tribal Tech albums
Albums produced by Scott Henderson